The Oberliga Nord was the fourth tier of the German football league system in the north of Germany. It covered the states of Lower Saxony, Bremen, Hamburg and Schleswig-Holstein. With the introduction of the 3. Liga, the league ceased to exist from 2008.

Overview

The first Oberliga Nord: 1947–1963
The original league of this name existed from 1947 to 1963 and was then the first tier of German football, covering the same region as the "new" Oberliga Nord. For its history, see here.

The second Oberliga Nord: 1974–1994
The league was formed in 1974 as a continuation of the Regionalliga Nord, the then second tier of German football. With the introduction of the 2nd Bundesliga Nord in that year, the Regionalliga was disbanded and its clubs spread among the new 2nd Bundesliga, Oberliga and Amateurligas.

The new Oberliga Nord however was only the third tier of the German football league system, replacing at this level the four Landes- and Amateurligas of Niedersachsen, Hamburg, Bremen and Schleswig-Holstein, who now slipped to the fourth tier of the league system.

Below the Oberliga were originally four leagues, one for each of the four states of the region. The Amateurliga of Niedersachsen changed its name to Landesliga from 1974 and after 1979 to Verbandsliga. The leagues in Bremen and Hamburg changed their name to Verbandsliga straight away in 1974. Schleswig-Holstein changed from Landesliga to Verbandsliga in 1978. In 1994, Niedersachsen, the largest of the four states, split its league into an eastern and a western group, a system already in place until 1964.

Due to the difference in playing strength of the Verbandsligas, champions were not directly promoted but had to go through a play-off system. Eight teams in two divisions were qualified for this competition, with three clubs from Niedersachsen, two each from Hamburg and Schleswig-Holstein and one from Bremen, to balance out the difference between the leagues.

In 1975 and 1976, the two first placed teams of the Oberliga took part in the promotion play-off to determine the promoted teams to the 2nd Bundesliga Nord. In 1977 and 1978, the top four teams from the Oberliga Nord went to this competition. With the reduction of the number of Oberligas in 1978, the winner and runners-up of the Oberliga Nord were directly promoted in 1979 and 1980.

No promotion was available in 1981 because the 2nd Bundesliga was reduced to one league only. From 1982, the top two teams in the league had to play-off for promotion again.

The Oberliga Nord was disbanded in 1994, with the re-introduction of the Regionalliga Nord, this time as the third tier of German football. Fourteen of its sixteen clubs went to the new Regionalliga, the bottom two teams were relegated to the two new Oberligas of Hamburg/Schleswig-Holstein and Niedersachsen/Bremen.

The third Oberliga Nord: 2004–2008
In 2004, after ten seasons, the Oberliga Nord was reformed, as the league below the Regionalliga Nord, being the fourth tier of football now. The two Oberligas that replaced it in 1994 were disbanded.

With the introduction of the 3. Liga and of a third Regionalliga in 2008, the Oberliga Nord again ceased to exist, being replaced by the five Verbandsligas in its stead. The top five clubs of the Oberliga in the 2007-08 season gained promotion to the Regionalliga Nord, the sixth placed team had to play-off with the Verbandsliga champions for another Regionalliga spot and the rest of the clubs were relegated to the Verbandsligas. The northern region therefore became the only region in Germany without an Oberliga after 2008. In future, the five Verbandsliga champions will have to play-off for two promotion spots to the Regionalliga Nord.

Champions of the Oberliga Nord
The league champions:

Placings in the Oberliga Nord 1975 to 2008
The clubs in the league and their final placings:

For final placings of Oberliga clubs from this region from 1994 to 2004, see Oberliga Niedersachsen/Bremen and Oberliga Hamburg/Schleswig-Holstein.
 1 In 2007 Holstein Kiel II was relegated due to the relegation of its first team.
 2 In 2007 VfR Neumünster was refused a licence and relegated.

Key

Founding members of the Oberliga Nord
The league started in 1974 with eighteen clubs from four German states:

From the Regionalliga Nord:
VfB Oldenburg
SV Meppen 
Arminia Hannover 
Concordia Hamburg 
OSV Hannover 
Holstein Kiel 
TuS Bremerhaven 93 
Heider SV 
Itzehoer SV
Phönix Lübeck

From the Landesliga Hamburg:
SC Victoria Hamburg 
SC Poppenbüttel

From the Amateurliga Bremen:
Blumenthaler SV 
Bremer SV

From the Landesliga Schleswig-Holstein:
SpVgg Flensburg 08

From the Amateurliga Niedersachsen:
Preußen Hameln 
SpVgg Bad Pyrmont 
Union Salzgitter

Disbanding of the Oberliga in 2008
At the end of its last season, 2007–08, the last round having been played on 30 May 2008, the clubs of the league were spread over various other divisions, according to their final league position. The 6th placed team, TuS Heeslingen, was not granted a Regionalliga licence and the 7th placed club, VfB Oldenburg, qualified for the play-offs instead. The Bremen champion, FC Bremerhaven, was also not granted a licence and the best place club from Bremen in the Oberliga, the FC Oberneuland, qualified instead. Its eighteen clubs went to the following leagues:

To the Regionalliga Nord:
Holstein Kiel 
SV Wilhelmshaven 
FC Altona 93  
BV Cloppenburg 
Hannover 96 II 
FC Oberneuland

To the Verbandsliga Bremen:
 no club relegated to this league

To the Verbandsliga Hamburg:
FC St. Pauli II
ASV Bergedorf 85
SV Lurup

To the Verbandsligas Niedersachsen:
VfB Oldenburg
TuS Heeslingen
SV Meppen
Eintracht Braunschweig II
VfL Osnabrück II
Eintracht Nordhorn
VSK Osterholz-Scharmbeck

To the Verbandsliga Schleswig-Holstein:
VfB Lübeck II
SV Henstedt-Rhen

References

Sources
 Deutschlands Fußball in Zahlen,  An annual publication with tables and results from the Bundesliga to Verbandsliga/Landesliga. DSFS.
 Kicker Almanach,  The yearbook on German football from Bundesliga to Oberliga, since 1937. Kicker Sports Magazine.
 Die Deutsche Liga-Chronik 1945-2005  History of German football from 1945 to 2005 in tables. DSFS. 2006.

External links
  Das deutsche Fussball Archiv Historic German league tables
  Northern German Football Association (NFV)

Nord
Football competitions in Bremen (state)
Football competitions in Hamburg
Football competitions in Lower Saxony
Football competitions in Schleswig-Holstein
1974 establishments in West Germany
2008 disestablishments in Germany
Sports leagues established in 1974
Sports leagues disestablished in 2008
Ger